Stina Jackson (née Olofsson; born 1983) is a Swedish crime fiction writer, a recipient of the Best Swedish Crime Novel Award and the Glass Key award.

Career
Jackson made her literary debut in 2018, with the crime novel Silvervägen. The novel was awarded the Best Swedish Crime Novel Award in 2018, and the Glass Key award in 2019.

Personal life
Born in 1983, in Skellefteå, Sweden, Jackson married American Robert Jackson and settled in Denver, Colorado. She eventually obtained double citizenship, both Swedish and American.

References

1983 births
Living people
People from Västerbotten County
People from Denver
Swedish-language writers
Swedish crime fiction writers
Swedish women writers